Victor Manuel Estrada Garibay (born October 28, 1971 in Matamoros, Tamaulipas) is a Mexican taekwondo practitioner and Olympic medalist. He competed at the 2000 Summer Olympics in Sydney where he received a bronze medal in the 80 kg division. He also competed at the 2004 Athens Olympics, finishing in equal fifth position.

Estrada also won a silver medal in the Middleweight at the 1993 World Taekwondo Championships in New York.

References

External links
 

1971 births
Living people
Mexican male taekwondo practitioners
Taekwondo practitioners at the 2000 Summer Olympics
Taekwondo practitioners at the 2004 Summer Olympics
Olympic bronze medalists for Mexico
Olympic taekwondo practitioners of Mexico
Olympic medalists in taekwondo
People from Matamoros, Tamaulipas
Sportspeople from Tamaulipas
Medalists at the 2000 Summer Olympics
Pan American Games gold medalists for Mexico
Pan American Games medalists in taekwondo
Central American and Caribbean Games gold medalists for Mexico
Competitors at the 1998 Central American and Caribbean Games
Competitors at the 2002 Central American and Caribbean Games
Cuautitlán Izcalli
Taekwondo practitioners at the 1995 Pan American Games
Taekwondo practitioners at the 1999 Pan American Games
Taekwondo practitioners at the 2003 Pan American Games
World Taekwondo Championships medalists
Central American and Caribbean Games medalists in taekwondo
Medalists at the 2003 Pan American Games